Wirksworth Railway Station is a heritage railway station that serves the town of Wirksworth in Derbyshire. The line was reopened as the Ecclesbourne Valley Railway.

History
The station was opened by the Midland Railway on 1 October 1867. The station was designed by the Midland Railway company architect John Holloway Sanders.

Stone was initially conveyed by horse and cart, but plans for a tramway were unpopular as it would have passed through the town. A standard gauge tunnel was built under the town, linking the quarry and the station yard and was opened on 17 November 1877.

The station yard remained in use for the carriage of stone, as the surrounding quarries and mineral lines were still operational. Unfortunately, this resulted in the demolition of the station buildings in 1968 as the space was needed for construction of freight facilities.

In mid-1984 the station was the terminus for a number of test runs of the then newly introduced BR class 150 diesel multiple units, which were later combined with charity fund-raising special excursions known as the Wirksworth Phoenix

The station was reopened on 1 October 2002 by Mr George Repton, who had been an engine driver on the line and the Wirksworth deputy mayor.

Film and TV appearances
In June 2007 Wirksworth was used as the fictional station of Lightbourne in the BBC television series Casualty, season 22, episode 05. In August 2009, the station was also used under the fictional guise of Castlebury for a new BBC Drama aired between 1 and 5 March 2010 called "Five Days II".

Operation
The service runs regularly at weekends, holidays and special events. Several separate services are provided from Wirksworth, depending on the event and the day. Services to Ravenstor leave from platform 3 and the services to Duffield operate from Platform 2. Platform 1 is not generally used for passenger services due to the lack of pointwork locks at the southern end of the platform.

Station Facilities
Booking Hall with seating area
Rest facilities
Buffet/café facilities (open 7 days a week all year)
Children's play area
Picnic area
2 ft Narrow Gauge line and 5 inch gauge miniature railway (open when staffed) 
Charity gift shop (open operating weekends)
Historical railway museum (open operating weekends)
Model Railway layouts, including N and OO scale (open operating weekends)

Route

References

External links

Ecclesbourne Valley Railway official website
YouTube video of reopeneing of Wirksworth station in 2002
Pictures of the station in 1953
Quarries around Wirksworth
Detailed track plan held at the Midland Railway Study Centre

Heritage railway stations in Derbyshire
Railway stations in Great Britain opened in 1867
Railway stations in Great Britain closed in 1947
Railway stations in Great Britain opened in 2002
1867 establishments in England
Former Midland Railway stations
John Holloway Sanders railway stations
Wirksworth